Lagundri Bay, or Sorake Bay, is a horseshoe-shaped bay at the southern end of the island of Nias off the coast of Sumatra in Indonesia. It is a popular tourist destination and a noted surf break.

Lagundri Bay surf break

Start as surf location

2005 Nias–Simeulue earthquake

Characteristics

References 

 Lowalani's Kingdom, Kevin Lovett, Tracks magazine, November 2005
 Personal diary written in June,1975, Michael Day.

Beaches of Indonesia
Surfing locations in Indonesia
Landforms of Sumatra
Bays of Indonesia
Landforms of North Sumatra